The SZD-25A Lis (Szybowcowy Zakład Doświadczalny - Glider Experimental Works) was a single-seat glider aircraft that was designed and built in Poland from 1955, derived from the SZD-16 Gil and SZD-25 Nov.

Development
Although design of the SZD-16 Gil was started in 1955, the prototype was not completed until 1958, when interest in gliders with metal structures increased. The SZD-16 was a simple single-seat training glider originally intended to form part of the  LPŻ (Soldier's Friends League) aero clubs training regime. The main designer was Zbigniew Badura. The fuselage was of metal and the wings were of wood.

The single-seat training methods were abandoned at around the time of the SZD-16's first flight, but the prototype was used for research into metal structures in gliders as well as new forms of air brakes. The SZD-16 was a cantilever shoulder-winged aircraft with the tail supported on a narrow tubular aluminium alloy boom extending from aft of the wooden wings, which attached to the pod-like welded steel tube fuselage housing the cockpit. Flight trials commenced with Adam Zientek piloting SP-1880 on the first flight on 20 October 1958. After the initial flight trials the fuselage was modified to accept wings from an SZD-22 Mucha Standard, to produce the SZD-16 Gil Z, which was used to test a new form of air brake.

Further testing and the need for single seater aircraft with reasonable performance for club flying,  prompted development of the SZD-16Z Gil Z fitted with a wing derived from that of the SZD-22 Mucha Standard. Improved structure, new wing and other improvements resulted in the SZD-25A Lis production aircraft, of which 30 were built.

Variants 
SZD-16 Gil - prototype of the Gil with tubular rear fuselage and low-performance wing.
SZD-16Z Gil Z - prototype SZD-16 fitted with wings adapted from the SZD-22 Mucha Standard.
SZD-25 Nov - production prototype version of the SZD-16Z Gil Z for use as club single-seat aircraft with improved performance over the SZD-16 trainer, 1 built.
SZD-25A Lis - production aircraft, 30 built, of which 13 were exported.

Specifications (SZD-25A Lis)

See also

References

Further reading
Taylor, J. H. (ed) (1989) Jane's Encyclopedia of Aviation. Studio Editions: London. p. 29

External links

http://www.piotrp.de/SZYBOWCE/pszd16.htm
http://www.vintagesailplanes.de/SZD_25.htm
http://www.luftfahrtmuseum.com/htmi/itf/szd25.htm
http://www.abpic.co.uk/photo/1087373/
http://www.piotrp.de/SZYBOWCE/pszd25.htm
http://www.the-blueprints.com/blueprints/modernplanes/modern-su-sz/18738/view/szd_16_gil/

1950s Polish sailplanes
SZD aircraft
Aircraft first flown in 1958